The List of awards and nominations received by  refers to the awards and nominations which were received by Albanian singer and songwriter Aurela Gaçe.

Awards and nominations 

Balkan Music Awards

|-
|rowspan="2"|2011
|rowspan="2"|"Origjinale"
|Best Song from Albania
|
|-
|Best Song from Balkans
|
|}
 
Festivali i Këngës

|-
||1997
||"E kemi fatin shpresë dhe marrëzi"
|First Place
|
|-
|rowspan="2"|1999
|rowspan="2"|"S´jam tribu"
|First Prize
|
|- 
|Best Performer 
|
|-
||2001
||"Jetoj"
|First Prize
|
|- 
||2010
||"Kënga Ime"
|First Prize 
|
|}

Kënga Magjike

|-
|rowspan="2"|2007
|rowspan="2"|"Hape Vetën"
|First Prize
|
|- 
|Best Performer
|
|-
|rowspan="2"|2014
|rowspan="2"|"Pa Kontroll"
|First Prize
|
|- 
|Hit Song
|
|- 
|rowspan="2"|2015
|rowspan="2"|"Akoma Jo"
|First Prize
|
|- 
|Best Performer
|
|}

Kult Awards

|-
||2016
||"Akoma Jo"
|Best Song of the Year
|
|}

Euro Fest

|-
||1998
||"Addicted To Love"
||Best Performer
|
|}

Netet e Klipt Shqipetar

|-
||2012
||"Tranzit"
|First Prize/Best Video
|
|-
|rowspan="2"|2013
|rowspan="2"|"Shpirt i Shpirtit Tim"
|Best Camera
|
|-
|Best Performer
|
|}

Videofest Awards

|-
||2011
||Origjinale
|Internet Prize
|
|}

Zhurma Show Awards

|-
||2010
||"Origjinale"
|Best Song
|
|}

References 

Gace, Aurela